Bhatola  is a Gondi village approx 2.5 km from Shikarpur in Bulandshahr district, in the Indian state of Uttar Pradesh. It is a mainly  Pandit & Tyagi village, with a population of about 3,000. 

Villages in Bulandshahr district